Carex distans, commonly known as distant sedge, is a plant species in the sedge family, Cyperaceae. It is native to Europe and North Africa. It is part of a complex of similar species that occur across Eurasia. Its relatives include Carex diluta of central Asia, which has also introduced to North America in Montana. C. distans has been introduced to US states including Maryland and Pennsylvania. More recently, it was found in Oregon. There is a report from Victoria, Australia as well.

Description
The inflorescence consists of widely separated spikes. The terminal spike is staminate and the lower 2–4 spikes are pistillate. Stigmas are 3 and achenes trigonous. 2n = 68, 70–72, 74.

Distribution
In Europe, these sedges grows in moist meadows, often on sandy or rocky soils.  They can grow in brackish marshes and are especially common along coastlines.  In the United States, they are found on ballast dumps and in other disturbed, sandy locations. The species is widespread and its overall population appears stable.

References

distans
Flora of Europe
Flora of Western Asia
Flora of North Africa
Plants described in 1759
Taxa named by Carl Linnaeus